Castilian-Leonese cuisine refers to the typical dishes and ingredients of the region of Castile and León in Spain. This cuisine is known for its cooked dishes (guiso) and its grilled or roasted meats (asado), its high-quality wines, the variety of its desserts, its sausages (embutidos), and its cheeses.

In addition, in certain areas of Castile and León, one can find the important production of apples, almond paste, and more.

Castilian-Leonese cuisine is built around stews and asados, as well as a large assortment of desserts. The major dishes in this cuisine are of veal, morcillas, legumes (such as green beans, chickpeas, and lentils), simple soups with garlic, and select wines. Other major dishes include pork and embutidos, found all over Castile and León, but that reach their peak in Salamanca (specifically in Guijuelo and Candelario); several types of empanadas; roast lamb and suckling pig; morcilla; haricots;  (eaten in reverse order); botillo of Bierzo; jamón from Guijuelo; and queso castellano (a sheep's-milk cheese).

Major wines in Castilian-Leonese cuisine include the robust wine of Toro, reds from Ribera del Duero, whites from Rueda, and clarets from Cigales.

Some typical dishes 
 Sopas de ajo
 

Ávila
 
 Yemas de Santa Teresa
 
 Hornazo
 Judías de El Barco de Ávila
 Cuchifrito
 Tostón asado o cochinillo

Burgos
 
  Lechazo (Ribera del Duero)
  (Ribera del Duero)
 Olla podrida
 

León

 Botillo
 Cecina
 Morcilla de León
 Valdeón cheese
 Sopas de ajo leonesas
 Vino de Tierra de León
 Cocido maragato

Palencia
 Menestra de verduras
 Lechazo asado
 Patatas a la importancia
 Cangrejos de río con tomate
 Morcilla de Fuenteandrino

Salamanca
 Hornazo
 Tostón asado o cochinillo
 Limones
 Amarguillos
 Chochos de yema
 Farinato

Segovia
 Cochinillo asado o tostón
 Ponche segoviano
 Judiones de la Granja
 Chorizo de Cantimpalos
 Lechazo asado

Soria
 Torreznos
 Culeca
 Chanfaina
 Perdices y codornices escabechadas

Valladolid

 Lechazo asado
 Mantecados de Portillo
 Morcilla de Valladolid
 Gallo turresilano
 Salchichas de Zaratán
 Vino de Cigales  (Wine of Cigales)
 Vino de Ribera de Duero (Wine of Ribera de Duero)
 Vino de Rueda (Wine of Rueda)
 Vino de Tierra de León (Wine of Tierra de León)
 Vino of Toro (Wine of Toro)

Zamora
 Rebojo
 Arroz a la zamorana

See also 
 Lechazo de Castilla y León

External links  
 Patrimonio Gastronómico de Castilla y León
 Alimentos de Castilla y León
  D.O. Ribera del Duero
  D.O. Cigales
  D.O. Rueda
  D.O. Toro